Castilians (Spanish: castellanos) are those people who live in certain former areas of the historical Kingdom of Castile, but the region's exact limits are disputed. A broader definition is to consider as Castilians the population belonging to the Iberian peninsular territories and the Canary Islands, which were controlled by the Crown of Castile and included a large part of the Iberian Peninsula.

However, not all people in the regions of the medieval Kingdom of Castile or Crown of Castile think of themselves as Castilian. For that reason, the exact limits of what is Castilian today are disputed. The western parts of Castile and León (that is, the Region of León), Cantabria and La Rioja are often also included in the definition, but that is controversial for historical reasons and for the strong sense of unique cultural identity of those regions. The Province of Albacete is also often included, but it was previously has part of the Region of Murcia. As an ethnicity, Castilians are most commonly associated with the sparsely-populated inner plateau of the Iberian peninsula, which is split into two by the Sistema Central mountain range in northern or Old Castile and southern or New Castile. 
 During the Reconquista and other conquests in the Middle Ages, the Kingdom of Castile (later Crown of Castile) spread over a large part of the Iberian Peninsula, especially towards the southern Spanish regions. In the 15th century, the Spanish colonization of the Americas made the Castilians also begin to spread over the New World, and they brought not only their language but also elements of their culture and traditions.

Language 
Castilian (castellano), that is, Spanish, is the native language of the Castilians. Its origin is traditionally ascribed to an area south of the Cordillera Cantábrica, including the upper Ebro valley, in northern Spain, around the 8th and 9th centuries; however the first written standard was developed in the 13th century in the southern city of Toledo. It is descended from the Vulgar Latin of the Roman Empire, with Arabic influences, and perhaps Basque as well. During the Reconquista in the Middle Ages, it was brought to the south of Spain where it replaced the languages that were spoken in the former Moorish controlled zones, such as the local form of related Latin dialects now referred to as Mozarabic, and the Arabic that had been introduced by the Muslims. In this process Castilian absorbed many traits from these languages, some of which continue to be used today. Outside of Spain and a few Latin American countries, Castilian is now usually referred to as Spanish.

Castilian (or Spanish) is the dominant language in Spain, and therefore was the language that was brought by the New World Conquistadores during the Spanish colonization of the Americas. Due to this gradual process, the Hispanophone world was created. As Castilian was the language of the Crown, it became the official language of all Spain, used side by side with other languages in their regions for centuries. During the years of the Francoist State (1939 to 1975) there was an attempt to suppress the regional languages in favour of Castilian as the sole official language, causing a backlash against the use of Castilian in some regions after his death.

In Spanish, the word castellano (Castilian) is often used to refer to the Spanish language, alongside español (Spanish). See Names given to the Spanish language.

Demographics

Religion
Castilian identity and culture is strongly connected to Roman Catholicism. It is the religion of the overwhelming majority of Castilians as a result of the settlement of Christian populations and forced assimilation of religious minorities (particularly Judaism and Islam) prior and during the Spanish Inquisition. The presence in the region of minority religions such as Protestantism, Orthodox Christianity, Islam or Judaism are the result of recent conversions or immigration.

See also

People
Castilian-Basque aristocracy
Spanish people
Andalusian people
Canarian people
Cantabrian people
Castile
Castilian Spanish
Castile (historical region)
Castile and León
Castile-La Mancha
Crown of Castile
Kingdom of Castile
Kingdom of León

References

 
Ethnic groups in Spain
Romance peoples
 
 
 
Castile (historical region)